This is a list of notable people from Liège, who were either born in Liège, or spent part of their life there.

People born in Liège

Before the 19th century
Saint Bavo, saint (6th century)
 The Carolingian dynasty originated in the Liège region
Charles Martel Mayor of the Palace of the Frankish court.
Pippin the Younger (in French: Pépin le Bref), King of the Franks (born in Jupille, 8th century)
Charlemagne, King of the Franks, then crowned emperor (birth in Liège uncertain, 8th century)
Alger of Liège, learned priest (11th century)
William of St-Thierry, theologian and mystic (11th century)
Juliana of Liège, nun and visionary (12th century)
Lambert le Bègue, priest and reformer (12th century)
Jacob of Liège, musician (13th century)
Peter Plaoul (1353–1415), bishop, scholastic philosopher and theologian
Johannes Ciconia, composer and theorist (14th century)	
Jean d'Outremeuse, writer and historian (14th century)
Jacques Arcadelt, composer (16th century)
Johann Theodor de Bry, engraver, draftsman, book editor and publisher (16th century)
Louis De Geer, merchant and industrialist (16th century)
Lambert Lombard, architect (16th century)
Matheo Romero, composer (16th century)
Jean-Guillaume Carlier, Flemish painter (1639-1676)
Gérard de Lairesse, painter (1640–1711)
Henri-Guillaume Hamal (1685-1752), musician and composer
André-Joseph Blavier, composer and choirmaster of Antwerp Cathedral (1717–1782)
André Ernest Modeste Grétry, composer (1741–1813)
Charlotte Stuart, Duchess of Albany (1753–1789)
Jean-Jacques Dony, inventor and industrialist (1759–1819)
Florimond Claude, Comte de Mercy-Argenteau, diplomat (1727–1794)
Gilles-François Closson, painter (1796–1842)

19th century
Noël Delfosse, lawyer, politician (1801–1858)
André Dumont, geologist (1809–1857)
Joseph Massart, violinist (1811–1892)
Hubert Joseph Walther Frère-Orban, statesman (1812–1896)
Gustave de Molinari, economist and political philosopher (1819–1912)
Heinrich Joseph Dominicus Denzinger, theologian and author (1819–1883)
Hubert Léonard, violinist (1819–1890)
César Franck, composer (1822–1890)
Florent Joseph Marie Willems, painter (1823–1905)
Zénobe Gramme, inventor (1826–1901)
Ernest Candèze, doctor and entomologist (1827–1898)
Georges Montefiore-Levi, inventor and philanthropist (1832–1906)
Émile Banning (1836–1898), civil servant
Georges Nagelmackers, founder of the Compagnie Internationale des Wagons-Lits (1845–1905)
Martin Pierre Marsick, violinist (1847 in Jupille-sur-Meuse—1924)
Constantin Le Paige, mathematician (1852–1929)
Gustave Serrurier-Bovy, architect and furniture designer (1858–1910)
Eugène Ysaÿe, composer and violinist (1858–1931)
Armand Rassenfosse, painter and lithographer (1862–1934)
Joseph Jongen, organist, composer, and educator (1873–1953)
Henri Gagnebin, composer (1886–1977)

20th century
Albert Van den Berg (resistant), doctor of law, resistance, saved Jews in WW2 (1890–1945)
Edouard Zeckendorf, doctor, army officer, and mathematician (1901–1983)
Jean Rey, lawyer and politician (1902–1983)
Georges Simenon, novelist (1903–1989)
Arthur Haulot, journalist, humanist, and poet (born in Angleur, 1913–2005)
Eddy Paape, cartoonist (born in Grivegnée, 1920)
Jean-Michel Charlier, writer of comic books and novels (1924–1989)
Jean-Claude Lorquet, chemist and professor (born 1935)
Axel Hervelle, Real Madrid basketball player (born 1983)
Hermann Huppen, comic book artist (born 1938)
Violetta Villas, singer and actress (1938–2011)
Jacques Hustin, singer-songwriter (1940–2009)
Noël Godin, writer, critic, actor and notorious cream pie flinger (born 1945)
Jean-Marie Klinkenberg, writer, critic, linguist and semioticians (born 1944)
Elmore D, musician (born 1946)
Patrick Nève, Formula One driver (born 1949)
Jean-Pierre Dardenne and Luc Dardenne, filmmakers (born 1951 and 1954, resp.)
Didier Reynders, politician (born 1958)
Armand Eloi, actor and director (born 1962)
Jean-Michel Saive, table tennis player (born 1969)
Isabelle Wéry, actress	
Ethel Houbiers, voice actress (born 1973)
Marie Gillain, actress (born 1975)
Justine Henin, tennis player (born 1982)
Jonatan Cerrada, singer (winner of A La Recherche De La Nouvelle Star) (born 1985)
Françoise Taylor (née Wauters), artist (1920 - 2007)

People associated with Liège

Before the 19th century

Saint Lambert, martyr (7th century)
Saint Hubert, first bishop of Liège (7th century)
Agilfride, bishop (8th century)
Ratherius, bishop (10th century)
Notger, first prince-bishop of Liège (10th century)
Conrad of Urach, canon of the cathedral of Liège (12th century)
Thomas of Cantimpré, writer, preacher, and theologian (13th century)
Pope Urban IV, archdeacon (13th century)
Engelbert III von der Marck, bishop (14th century)
John Mandeville, naturalist, philosopher, and astrologer (14th century)
Johannes Brassart, composer at the church of St Jean l'Evangeliste (15th century)
William de la Marck, political character of the Prince-Bishopric of Liège (15th century)
Ernest of Bavaria, bishop (16th century)
Macropedius, humanist and headmaster of St Jerome (16th century)
Rinaldo del Mel, composer (16th century)
Johannes Sleidanus, historian (16th century)
Ferdinand of Bavaria, bishop (17th century)
François Walther de Sluze, mathematician and canon (17th century)
Peter Wright, martyr and priest (17th century)
Clementina Walkinshaw, mistress of Prince Charles Edward Stuart (18th century)
François-Xavier de Feller, author and professor (18th century)

19th century

Eugène Charles Catalan, mathematician, taught at the University of Liège
Etienne Constantin, Baron de Gerlache, politician and historian
Laurent-Guillaume de Koninck, paleontologist and chemist, taught at the University of Liège
Philippe Auguste Hennequin, painter, pupil of David
Godefroid Kurth, historian, taught at the University of Liège
Jean Théodore Lacordaire, entomologist, taught at the University of Liège
Joseph Lebeau, statesman and newspaper founder
Antoine Joseph Wiertz, painter

20th century

André Cools, politician, assassinated in Liège in 1991
Mathieu Crickboom, violinist and main disciple of Eugène Ysaÿe
Lucien Godeaux, one of the most published mathematicians
Pierre Harmel, lawyer, politician, and diplomat, taught at the University of Liège
Gary Hartstein, associate professor of medicine at the University of Liège
Steve Houben, jazz saxophonist and flutist, created the jazz seminar at the Conservatoire Royal de Musique de Liège
 Jacques Ochs (1883–1971), artist and Olympic fencing champion
Henri Pousseur, composer, taught at the University of Liège and at the Conservatoire Royal de Musique de Liège
Frederic Rzewski, composer and virtuoso pianist, taught at the Conservatoire Royal de Musique de Liège

Liege
Liege
Liege
Liège